In the mathematical field of representation theory, a Kazhdan–Lusztig polynomial  is a member of a family of integral polynomials introduced by . They are indexed by pairs of elements y, w of a  Coxeter group W, which can in particular be the Weyl group of a Lie group.

Motivation and history
In the spring of 1978 Kazhdan and Lusztig were studying Springer representations of the Weyl group of an algebraic group on -adic cohomology groups related to conjugacy classes which are unipotent. They found a new construction of these representations over the complex numbers . The representation had two natural bases, and the transition matrix between these two bases is essentially given by the Kazhdan–Lusztig polynomials. The actual Kazhdan–Lusztig construction of their polynomials is more elementary. Kazhdan and Lusztig used this to construct a canonical basis in the Hecke algebra of the Coxeter group and its representations.

In their first paper Kazhdan and Lusztig mentioned that their polynomials were related to the failure of local Poincaré duality for Schubert varieties. In  they reinterpreted this in terms of the intersection cohomology of Mark Goresky and Robert MacPherson, and gave another definition of such a basis in terms of the dimensions of certain intersection cohomology groups.

The two bases for the Springer representation reminded Kazhdan and Lusztig of the two bases for the Grothendieck group of certain infinite dimensional representations of semisimple Lie algebras, given by Verma modules and simple modules. This analogy, and the work of Jens Carsten Jantzen and Anthony Joseph relating primitive ideals of enveloping algebras to representations of Weyl groups, led to the Kazhdan–Lusztig conjectures.

Definition 
Fix a Coxeter group W with generating set S, and write  for the length of an element w (the smallest length of an expression for w as a product of elements of S).

The quadratic second relation implies that each generator  is invertible in the Hecke algebra, with inverse . More generally one has ; also D can be seen to be an involution.

The Kazhdan–Lusztig polynomials Pyw(q) are indexed by a pair of elements y, w of W, and uniquely determined by the following properties. 
They are 0 unless y ≤ w (in the Bruhat order of W), 1 if y = w, and for y < w their degree is at most (ℓ(w) − ℓ(y) − 1)/2.
The elements

are invariant under the involution D of the Hecke algebra. The elements  form a basis of the Hecke algebra as a -module, called the Kazhdan–Lusztig basis.

To establish existence of the Kazhdan–Lusztig polynomials, Kazhdan and Lusztig gave a simple recursive procedure for computing the polynomials Pyw(q) in terms of more elementary polynomials denoted Ryw(q). defined by

They can be computed using the recursion relations

The Kazhdan–Lusztig polynomials can then be computed recursively using the relation

using the fact that the two terms on the left are polynomials in q1/2 and q−1/2 without constant terms. These formulas are tiresome to use by hand for rank greater than about 3, but are well adapted for computers, and the only limit on computing Kazhdan–Lusztig polynomials with them is that for large rank the number of such polynomials exceeds the storage capacity of computers.

Examples
If y ≤ w then Py,w has constant term 1. 
If y ≤ w and  then Py,w = 1.
If w = w0 is the longest element of a finite Coxeter group then Py,w = 1 for all y.
If W is the Coxeter group A1 or A2 (or more generally any Coxeter group of rank at most 2)  then Py,w is 1 if y≤w and 0 otherwise.
If W is the Coxeter group A3 with generating set S = {a, b, c} with a and c commuting then Pb,bacb = 1 + q  and  Pac,acbca = 1 + q, giving examples of non-constant polynomials.
The simple values of Kazhdan–Lusztig polynomials for low rank groups are not typical of higher rank groups. For example, for the split form of E8 the most complicated Lusztig–Vogan polynomial (a variation of Kazhdan–Lusztig polynomials: see below) is

 showed that any polynomial with constant term 1 and non-negative integer coefficients is the Kazhdan–Lusztig polynomial for some pair of elements of some symmetric group.

Kazhdan–Lusztig conjectures
The Kazhdan–Lusztig polynomials arise as transition coefficients between their canonical basis and the natural basis of the Hecke algebra. The Inventiones paper also put forth two equivalent conjectures, known now as Kazhdan–Lusztig conjectures, which related the values of their polynomials at 1 with representations of complex semisimple Lie groups and Lie algebras, addressing a long-standing problem in representation theory.

Let W be a finite Weyl group. For each w ∈ W denote by  be the Verma module of highest weight  where ρ is the half-sum of positive roots (or Weyl vector), and let  be its irreducible quotient, the simple highest weight module of highest weight . Let us  write ch(X) for the character of a g-module X. The Kazhdan–Lusztig conjectures state:

 
 

where  is the element of maximal length of the Weyl group.

The methods introduced in the course of the proof have guided development of representation theory throughout the 1980s and 1990s, under the name geometric representation theory.

Remarks 
1. The two conjectures are known to be equivalent. Thus, the Kazhdan–Lusztig conjectures describe the Jordan–Hölder multiplicities of Verma modules in any regular integral block of Bernstein–Gelfand–Gelfand category O.

2.

3. David Vogan showed as a consequence of the conjectures that

and that  vanishes if  is odd, so the dimensions of all such Ext groups in category O are determined in terms of coefficients of Kazhdan–Lusztig polynomials. This result demonstrates that all coefficients of the Kazhdan–Lusztig polynomials of a finite Weyl group are non-negative integers. However, positivity for the case of a finite Weyl group W was already known from the interpretation of coefficients of the Kazhdan–Lusztig polynomials as the dimensions of intersection cohomology groups, irrespective of the conjectures. Conversely, the relation between Kazhdan–Lusztig polynomials and the Ext groups theoretically can be used to prove the conjectures, although this approach to proving them turned out to be more difficult to carry out.

4. Some special cases of the Kazhdan–Lusztig conjectures are easy to verify. For example, M1 is the antidominant Verma module, which is known to be simple. This means that M1 = L1, establishing the second conjecture for w = 1, since the sum reduces to a single term. On the other hand, the first conjecture for w = w0 follows from the Weyl character formula and the formula for the character of a Verma module, together with the fact that all Kazhdan–Lusztig polynomials  are equal to 1.

5. Kashiwara (1990) proved a generalization of the Kazhdan–Lusztig conjectures to symmetrizable Kac–Moody algebras.

Relation to intersection cohomology of Schubert varieties
By the Bruhat decomposition the space G/B of the algebraic group G with Weyl group W is a disjoint union of affine spaces Xw parameterized by elements w of W. The closures of these spaces  are called Schubert varieties, and Kazhdan and Lusztig, following a suggestion of Deligne, showed how to express Kazhdan–Lusztig polynomials in terms of intersection cohomology groups of Schubert varieties.

More precisely, the Kazhdan–Lusztig polynomial Py,w(q) is equal to 

where each term on the right means: take the complex IC of sheaves whose hyperhomology is the intersection homology of the Schubert variety of w (the closure of the cell ), take its cohomology of degree , and then take the dimension of the stalk of this sheaf at any point of the cell  whose closure is the Schubert variety of y. The odd-dimensional cohomology groups do not appear in the sum because they are all zero.

This gave the first proof that all coefficients of Kazhdan–Lusztig polynomials for finite Weyl groups are non-negative integers.

Generalization to real groups 
They are analogous to Kazhdan–Lusztig polynomials, but are tailored to representations of real semisimple Lie groups, and play major role in the conjectural description of their unitary duals. Their definition is more complicated, reflecting relative complexity of representations of real groups compared to complex groups.

The distinction, in the cases directly connection to representation theory, is explained on the level of double cosets; or in other terms of actions on analogues of complex flag manifolds G/B where G is a complex Lie group and B a Borel subgroup. The original (K-L) case is then about the details of decomposing

,

a classical theme of the Bruhat decomposition, and before that of Schubert cells in a Grassmannian. Then the relevant object of study is

.

In March 2007, it was announced that the L–V polynomials had been calculated for the split form of E8.

Generalization to other objects in representation theory 
The second paper of Kazhdan and Lusztig established a geometric setting for definition of Kazhdan–Lusztig polynomials, namely, the geometry of singularities of Schubert varieties in the flag variety. Much of the later work of Lusztig explored analogues of Kazhdan–Lusztig polynomials in the context of other natural singular algebraic varieties arising in representation theory, in particular, closures of nilpotent orbits and quiver varieties. It turned out that the representation theory of quantum groups, modular Lie algebras and affine Hecke algebras are all tightly controlled by appropriate analogues of Kazhdan–Lusztig polynomials. They admit an elementary description, but the deeper properties of these polynomials necessary for representation theory follow from sophisticated techniques of modern algebraic geometry and homological algebra, such as the use of intersection cohomology, perverse sheaves and Beilinson–Bernstein–Deligne decomposition.

The coefficients of the Kazhdan–Lusztig polynomials are conjectured to be the dimensions of some homomorphism spaces in Soergel's bimodule category. This is the only known positive interpretation of these coefficients for arbitrary Coxeter groups.

Combinatorial theory 
Combinatorial properties of Kazhdan–Lusztig polynomials and their generalizations are a topic of active current research. Given their significance in representation theory and algebraic geometry, attempts have been undertaken to develop the theory of Kazhdan–Lusztig polynomials in purely combinatorial fashion, relying to some extent on geometry, but without reference to intersection cohomology and other advanced techniques. This has led to exciting developments in algebraic combinatorics, such as pattern-avoidance phenomenon.

, there is no known combinatorial interpretation of all the coefficients of the Kazhdan–Lusztig polynomials (as the cardinalities of some natural sets) even for the symmetric groups, though explicit formulas exist in many special cases.

Inequality 
Let  be a crystallographic Coxeter system 
and  its Kazhdan–Lusztig polynomials.

References
. 
. 
.
.
.
.
.
.
.
.
.
.
.
.

External links
Readings from Spring 2005 course on Kazhdan–Lusztig Theory at U.C. Davis by Monica Vazirani
 
The GAP programs for computing Kazhdan–Lusztig polynomials. 
Fokko du Cloux's Coxeter software for computing Kazhdan–Lusztig polynomials for any Coxeter group
Atlas software for computing Kazhdan–Lusztig-Vogan polynomials.

Polynomials
Representation theory of Lie groups
Representation theory of Lie algebras
 
Algebraic combinatorics